António da Silva Osório Braga Soares Carneiro, OA ComI GCTE (25 January 1928 - 28 January 2014), was a Portuguese military officer. A general in the Portuguese Army, he was the governor of a southern province of Portuguese Angola during the Carnation Revolution, which deposed the Estado Novo on 25 April 1974.

In the 1980 presidential election, the right-wing Democratic Alliance, a coalition of the Social Democratic Party, the Democratic and Social Centre and the People's Monarchist Party, nominated Soares Carneiro as its candidate. Two of his leading supporters, Prime Minister Francisco Sá Carneiro (no relation) and Defence Minister Adelino Amaro da Costa died in a plane crash while heading for a rally in Porto two days before the election. Most polls suggest that the deaths did not have much influence in the result of the presidential elections since they predicted the re-election of President, General António Ramalho Eanes, who won 56% of the votes, was opposed to Soares Carneiro's 40%.

Soares Carneiro later served as Chief of the General Staff of the Armed Forces, under the presidency of Mário Soares.

He died in Lisbon.

External links
General António Soares Carneiro Profile

References

1928 births
2014 deaths
Portuguese Roman Catholics
Portuguese military officers
Candidates for President of Portugal
Portuguese colonial governors and administrators
People from Matosinhos
Recipients of the Order of the Tower and Sword